Harold Corbin (December 31, 1906 – June 12, 1988) was an American fencer. He competed in the individual épée event at the 1932 Summer Olympics.

References

External links
 

1906 births
1988 deaths
American male épée fencers
Olympic fencers of the United States
Fencers at the 1932 Summer Olympics
People from Winfield, Kansas